Hudson High School can refer to:
Hudson High School (Florida) in Hudson, FL
Hudson High School (Iowa) in Hudson, IA
Hudson High School (Massachusetts) in Hudson, MA
Hudson High School (Michigan) in Hudson, MI
Hudson High School (New York) in Hudson, NY
Hudson High School (Ohio) in Hudson, OH
Hudson High School (Texas) in Lufkin, TX
Hudson High School (Wisconsin) in Hudson, WI